Lloyd Saunders (23 September 1897 – 8 March 1984) was a New Zealand cricketer. He played one first-class match for Auckland in 1925/26.

See also
 List of Auckland representative cricketers

References

External links
 

1897 births
1984 deaths
New Zealand cricketers
Auckland cricketers
Cricketers from Waikato